The Ming tombs are a collection of mausoleums built by the emperors of the Ming dynasty of China. The first Ming emperor's tomb is located near his capital Nanjing. However, the majority of the Ming tombs are located in a cluster near Beijing and collectively known as the Thirteen Tombs of the Ming dynasty. The site, on the southern slope of Tianshou Mountain (originally Huangtu Mountain), was chosen based on the principles of feng shui by the third Ming emperor, the Yongle Emperor. After the construction of the Imperial Palace (Forbidden City) in 1420, the Yongle Emperor selected his burial site and created his own mausoleum. The subsequent emperors placed their tombs in the same valley.

From the Yongle Emperor onwards, thirteen Ming emperors were buried in the same area. The Xiaoling Mausoleum of the first Ming emperor, the Hongwu Emperor, is located near his capital Nanjing; the second emperor, the Jianwen Emperor, was overthrown by the Yongle Emperor and disappeared, without a known tomb. The "temporary" emperor, the Jingtai Emperor, was also not buried here, as the Tianshun Emperor had denied him an imperial burial; instead, the Jingtai Emperor was buried west of Beijing. The last emperor buried at the location was Chongzhen, the last of his dynasty, who committed suicide by hanging on April 25, 1644. He was buried in his concubine Consort Tian's tomb, which was later declared as an imperial mausoleum Siling by the emperor of the short-lived Shun dynasty, Li Zicheng, with a much smaller scale compared to the other imperial mausoleums built for Ming emperors.

During the Ming dynasty, the tombs were off limits to commoners, but in 1644 Li Zicheng's army ransacked and burned many of the tombs  before advancing to and subsequently capturing Beijing in April of that year.

In 1725, the Yongzheng Emperor bestowed the hereditary title of marquis on a descendant of the Ming imperial family, Zhu Zhilian, who received a salary from the Qing government and whose duty was to perform rituals at the Ming tombs. He was posthumously promoted to Marquis of Extended Grace in 1750 by the Qianlong Emperor, and the title passed on through twelve generations of Ming descendants until the end of the Qing dynasty.

Presently, the Ming tombs are designated as one of the components of the World Heritage Site, the Imperial Tombs of the Ming and Qing Dynasties, which also includes a number of other locations near Beijing and in Nanjing, Hebei, Hubei, Liaoning province.

Layout

The siting of the Ming dynasty imperial tombs was carefully chosen according to Feng Shui (geomancy) principles. According to these, bad spirits and evil winds descending from the North must be deflected; therefore, an arc-shaped valley area at the foot of the Jundu Mountains, north of Beijing, was selected. This 40 square kilometer area—enclosed by the mountains in a pristine, quiet valley full of dark earth, tranquil water and other necessities as per Feng Shui—would become the necropolis of the Ming dynasty.

A  road named the "Spirit Way" leads into the complex, lined with statues of guardian animals and officials, with a front gate consisting of a three-arches, painted red, and called the "Great Red Gate". The Spirit Way, or Sacred Way, starts with a huge stone memorial archway lying at the front of the area. Constructed in 1540, during the Ming dynasty, this archway is one of the biggest stone archways in China today.

Further in, the Shengong Shengde Stele Pavilion can be seen; inside, there is a 50-ton stone statue of a Bixi carrying a memorial tablet. Four white marble Huabiao (pillars of glory) are positioned at each corner of the stele pavilion. At the top of each pillar is a mythical beast. Each side of the road is flanked by two pillars whose surfaces are carved with the cloud design, and tops are shaped like a rounded cylinder. They are of a traditional design, and were originally beacons to guide the soul of the deceased, The road leads to 18 pairs of stone statues of mythical animals, which are all sculpted from whole stones and larger than life size, leading to a three-arched gate known as the Dragon and Phoenix Gate.

At present, only three tombs are open to the public. There have been no excavations since 1989, but plans for new archeological research and further opening of tombs have circulated. They can be seen on Google earth: Changling, the largest; Dingling, whose underground palace has been excavated; and Zhaoling.

The Ming tombs were listed as a UNESCO World Heritage Site in August 2003. They were listed along with other tombs under the "Imperial Tombs of the Ming and Qing Dynasties" designation.

List of the Imperial Tombs
The imperial tombs are in chronological order and list the individuals buried:

The Ming emperors not buried in one of the Thirteen Tombs are: Hongwu Emperor, Zhu Biao, Emperor Kang, Jianwen Emperor, Jingtai Emperor, and Zhu Youyuan, Emperor Xian.

Images

See also
 Ming Xiaoling Mausoleum in Nanjing
 Ming Ancestors Mausoleum in Jiangsu Province
 Eastern Qing tombs near Beijing
 Western Qing tombs near Beijing
 The three imperial tombs north of the great wall
 Fuling Tomb east of Shenyang in Liaoning
 Zhao Mausoleum north of Shenyang in Liaoning
 Yongling Tombs east of Fushun in Liaoning

References

External links

Imperial Tombs of the Ming and Qing Dynasties  on the  UNESCO World Heritage List

15th-century architecture
15th century in China
16th-century architecture
16th century in China
17th-century architecture
17th century in China
Buildings and structures in Beijing
Cemeteries in Beijing
Tombs
Changping District
Major National Historical and Cultural Sites in Beijing
Ming
Ming dynasty architecture
Tourist attractions in Beijing
World Heritage Sites in China